Ekaterina Makarova and Elena Vesnina were the two-time defending champions, but Vesnina chose not to participate this year.

Ashleigh Barty and Demi Schuurs won the title, defeating Makarova and Latisha Chan in the final, 4–6, 6–3, [10–8].

By reaching the final with Makarova, Chan regained the WTA no. 1 doubles ranking at the end of the tournament. Tímea Babos and Kateřina Siniaková were also in contention for the top ranking at the start of the tournament.

Seeds
The top four seeds received byes into the second round.

Draw

Finals

Top half

Bottom half

References
Main Draw

Women's Doubles
2018 in Canadian women's sports